The Southern League was the amateur football championship in Southern Italy during the 20's of the 20th century.

The 1924–25 season was organized within the Italian Football Federation. The winner had the honour to play against the Northern Champions.

The League maintained the goal to improve the quality of the game in the area. As a new step, the League decided to reduce the regional tournaments to six matchdays for 1925–26 to improve the inter-league playoffs.

Qualifications

Marche 
Anconitana was the only participating team.

Lazio

Classification

Results table

Campania

Classification

Results table

Apulia

Classification

Results table

Apulia's Championship play-off 
Played on March 29, 1925, in Naples.

Sicily

Qualification 

Messina qualified for the semifinals.

Semifinals

Group A

Classification

Results table

Tie-breaker 
Played on June 28, 1925, in Naples.

Group B

Classification

Results table

Finals

Alba Roma qualified for the National Finals.

Footnotes

Football in Italy